Chambersburg Township is a township in Iredell County, North Carolina, United States. The 2010 United States Census reported a total population of 11,344.

Geography

Chambersburg Township covers an area of 48.4 square miles (125.36 km2), and of this, 0.3 square miles (0.78 km2), or 0.62 percent, is water. 

Chambersburg Township lies within the Yadkin–Pee Dee River Basin. Bodies of water within Chambersburg Township include the following. This is not a complete list.

 South Yadkin River
 Duck Creek
 Fourth Creek
 Greasy Creek
 I-L Creek
 Little Creek
 Third Creek

City
 Statesville (part)

Unincorporated communities
 Amity Hill

Historical sites of interest

 Beavers Country Store, 
 Bethesda Methodist Church, organized as AME Zion in early 1900s
 Bethesda Presbyterian Church (oldest existing church building in Iredell County, built in 1853), 
 Cool Springs Volunteer Fire Department, organized in 1960, 
 Congers Post Office (1874-1880)
 Elpikora Two Room School, destroyed by fire in May 1916
 Elmwood
 Elmwood Post Office (1878-1954), 
 Elmwood First Baptist Church
 Elmwood Presbyterian Church, organized in 1887
 Elmwood School
 Enola Post Office (1858-1872)
 First demonstration, J.F. Eagles became the first North Carolina farmer to undertake a demonstration under the supervision of a county agent, 
 Farmville Plantation, formerly known as the Chambers Plantation
 Lingle School
 New Salem Methodist Church, organized in 1870
 New Union Methodist Church, established in 1836 
 Plyers Church, became Shiloh Church, early 1800s
 Plyers School
 Vance School and Post Office (historical), 

The Enola Post office was established west of Statesville at the intersection of the Western Road and Georgia Road when the Western North Carolina Railroad was completed in 1858.  The first postmaster was Robert Wallace Leslie (1835-1894).  The Enola Post Office was used in enumeration of residents in the 1860 and 1870 U.S. Federal Census.  The postal route covered residents north of the rail line to the South Yadkin River and south of the rail line in School District 51.  While the name "Enola" is reported to have come from a popular novel of the day ("Enola" by Mary Young Ridenbaugh, published in 1886), it most likely predates this book.   "Enola" is "Alone" spelled backwards.  Although the Enola Post Office was discontinued in 1872, Thomas J. Conger established a post office there in 1889, called Conger's.  Conger's was discontinued in 1880.  The main post office and rail station east of Statesville was later known as Elmwood.

The community of Vance was located in Chambersburg Springs Township from 1882-1901 with William W. Turner (1844-1926) as first post master.

Cemeteries
Cemeteries exist within the boundaries of Chambersburg Township at the following locations. This is not to be considered a complete list.

 Abilene Church - 
 Amity Evangelical Lutheran Church - 
 Antioch Baptist Church - 
 Belmont Cemetery - 
 Bethesda Presbyterian Church Cemetery - 
 Faith Baptist Church - 
 Gays Chapel - 
 New Salem United Methodist Church - 
 Oakdale Baptist Church - 
 Shady Grove Baptist Church - 
 Shiloh United Methodist Church -

Transportation

Major highways

Recreation 

Chambersburg Township has several public and private places for recreation.

Public 

 Statesville Greenway (part, including two access points)
 Statesville Park and Soccer Complex

Private 

 Kampgrounds of America (KOA) Statesville/I-77 campground
 Real McCoy Family Campground
 Statesville Country Club
 Twin Oaks Golf Club

See also 

 Chambersburg Township, Illinois

Adjacent townships 

The United States Census Bureau shows the following townships adjacent to Chambersburg.

 Cool Springs (north)
 Scotch Irish, Rowan County (northeast)
 Cleveland, Rowan County (east)
 Mount Ulla, Rowan County (southeast)
 Barringer (south)
 Statesville Township (west)
 Bethany (northwest)

References

 

Townships in Iredell County, North Carolina
1868 establishments in North Carolina